Senegal competed at the 1968 Summer Olympics in Mexico City, Mexico.

Basketball
Senegal qualified for the first time in basketball at the 1968 Olympics by winning the 1968 FIBA Africa Championship in Morocco over the Moroccan hosts. However, once at the tournament, Senegal lost all 7 of its matches to the Americans, Puerto Ricans, Italians, Panamanians, Yugoslavs, Filipinos and Spaniards on their way to last place in the tournament.

References
 Official Olympic Reports
 Senegal at the 1968 Summer Olympics at sportsofworld.com

Nations at the 1968 Summer Olympics
1968 Summer Olympics
Oly